Frank Gerald Blaker VC MC (8 May 1920 – 9 July 1944) was a British-Indian recipient of the Victoria Cross, the highest and most prestigious award for gallantry in the face of the enemy that can be awarded to British and Commonwealth forces.

Details
Born in Kasauli, Punjab, India, Blaker was educated at the St. Paul's School, Darjeeling.

Blaker was 24 years old, and a temporary Major in the Highland Light Infantry, British Army, attached to 3rd Battalion, 9th Gurkha Rifles, the khas battalion in the Indian Army during World War II when the following deed took place for which he was awarded the VC.

On 9 July 1944 near Taungni, Burma (now Myanmar), Major Blaker was commanding a company of khas soldiers which was held up during an important advance by close-range firing from medium and light machine guns. The major went ahead of his men through very heavy fire and despite being severely wounded in the arm, located the machine-guns and charged the position alone. Even when mortally wounded he continued to cheer on his men whilst lying on the ground. His fearless leadership inspired his men to storm and capture the objective.

John Masters, the author, was Blaker's brigade commander. He remembered him as Captain Jim Blaker. Writing 16 years later, he describes how the brigade was climbing a ridge with great difficulty to take a hill called Point 2171 from a determined and well-led force of Japanese. He resolved to send a force up a neighbouring ridge and required the battalion commander to send his best officer to lead the attack. Both commanders agreed that the best man was Blaker. Next morning he saw off the company and "told Blaker to make bloody sure he was on the right ridge and that he got to the top. Then tried to smile. Blaker really did smile, saw it in the radio light". By this time the whole brigade was nearly exhausted. Moving and climbing in the jungle was very difficult. "It took Jim Blaker an hour and a half to reach the foot of his ridge. Nearly five hours to climb up it. This for a mile and a half without opposition. Near the top he saw that the crest and northern flank of Point 2171 were strongly defended by automatics, woodpecker machine guns and mortars. After sending his message to me" ('ready, very close, ready to go') "and waiting for the covering bombardment" (strong mortar and machine gun fire ordered by Masters) "Jim ordered the charge. His leading men came under machine guns firing directly down the ridge. They dived into the dense jungle, tried to crawl up on hands and knees. Men fell, the advance stopped. Jim went forward alone then, firing his carbine, calling 'Come on khas Company'. Seven machine gun bullets through the stomach. He sank down, against a tree, turned his head, 'Come on khasya Company, I’m going to die. Take the position'. The Chhetris swept on up. Bayonets. Ayo Gurkhali, the Gurkhas have come !  That night I wrote out the citation for Blaker’s Victoria Cross, which was immediately awarded, posthumously". 

Blaker died as a result of the wounds he received in this action. His grave is located in the Taukkyan War Cemetery, 20 miles north of Rangoon (now Yangon), Burma (now Myanmar). It is located in Plot VI, Row E, Grave 2.

Medal entitlement

See also
List of Brigade of Gurkhas recipients of the Victoria Cross

References

Bibliography
British VCs of World War 2 (John Laffin, 1997)
Monuments to Courage (David Harvey, 1999)
The Register of the Victoria Cross (This England, 1997)

1920 births
1944 deaths
Indian World War II recipients of the Victoria Cross
Highland Light Infantry officers
British World War II recipients of the Victoria Cross
Recipients of the Military Cross
British Army personnel killed in World War II
People from Solan district
Royal Gurkha Rifles officers
Indian Army personnel killed in World War II
Burials at Taukkyan War Cemetery
Military personnel of British India